III-Vs Review was a magazine published in Northampton, UK. It existed between 1987 and 2007.

History and profile
It was founded in 1987 by XMT Ltd., in Northampton, UK. as Euro III-Vs Review. The founding editor was Roy Szweda, who continues as an associate editor contributing articles, editorials and news. The inspiration for the launch was the U.S. magazine III-Vs Technology Review. It featured articles on advanced semiconductor industry.

III-Vs Review was published nine times a year by Elsevier Science in Oxford until 2007.

References

External links
III-Vs Review

Science and technology magazines published in the United Kingdom
Engineering magazines
Magazines established in 1987
Magazines disestablished in 2007
Nine times annually magazines
Mass media in Northamptonshire
Defunct magazines published in the United Kingdom
Mass media in Oxford